Ashta is a city and a municipality in Sehore district  in the state of Madhya Pradesh, India. The nearest airport is in the city of Bhopal.

Geography
It has an average elevation of 519 metres (1702 feet and 4 hands). Running through the center of the city is a river named "Parvati" after the Hindu goddess Parvati. The river is the main source of water for the city's inhabitants. Near the river, there is a temple to Shiva, husband to the goddess, which is believed to date back as far as 3500 years. Locals believe that in the month of Sawan (during the rainy season), the river Parvati gets flooded with water and the water level rises until that level when it reaches to Shiv-Ling (Lingam) in the Shiva temple on its bank.

History
During the British India period, this area was ruled by Mirza Amjad Baig, regarded as the founder of present-day Ashta. He not only brought transportation to the city but also established an education system for both men and women.

Transport 
The nearest airport is Bhopal.

Places 
Ashta's facilities include hospitals, schools, a cinema hall, and road transport. There are 194 rural villages in the Ashta administrative block. Ashta is Also known for its grain market, known as "Mandi" in local language. Products sold in the grain market include soybean and wheat.

Some notable local places:
 Shankar Mandir: A temple in Ashta. on the bank of river Parvati.
 Khedapati Temple: Khedapati Temple is one of the temples in Ashta. It is situated near a pond. This temple is dedicated to the deity Hanuman.
 Jain Temple: situated on a hill locally named Kila (Fort). Here moolnayak (the main statue) is Shri Neminath Bhagwan. This is also an Atishay Kshetra.
 Bager Village: Bager is an ancient village near Ashta established by Bhagwan (Bhati) Thakur. People in the surrounding area called it khas (special). There is a big pond, many temples, and schools. The name of this village is proposed to be named Ramkrishna Dham, the main road towards Ashta is Matvy Road.
 Bhounra Ilahi Mata Mandir & Digamber Jain Mandir: this area near Ashta is home to a majority of the local people of the Parmar samaj clan. This village is around 12 km from bhounra.
 Bhadbhada and Bhawar Kunwa: This village has many schools, including Raja Bhoj H. Secondary School. According to Dr. Avdhesh Parmar there is a great Melā held each year in the month of April on the premises of Mata Rani. Ilahi Mata Mandir, a very old ancient temple, is located in the village Bhounra 15 km from Ashta City. Special Pooja is being held on Navratri.  
 Kajikhedi: an ancient village near Ashta. It is a very old dense forest and there is a banyan tree that is almost three hundred years old.
 Samarda-It: a village near Ashta containing an ancient temple of Devi Maa. A Melā is organized here every year between the months of March and April. It also has an ancient temple of Lord Shiva made of stones.

Demographics
As of India's 2011 census, Ashta's population was 53,184. Male Population is  27591(51.90%), and Female population is 25593(48.12%). Ashta has an average literacy rate of 68.23%.

The population of Children with age 0–6 is 7483 which is 14.07% of the total population of Ashta (M + OG). In Ashta Municipality, the Female Sex Ratio is 928 against the state average of 931. Moreover, the Child Sex Ratio in Ashta is around 933 compared to the Madhya Pradesh state average of 918. The Literacy rate of Ashta city is 63.24%.

Municipality
Ashta city is divided into 19 wards for which elections are held every 5 years.

Ashta Municipality has total administration of over 10,006 houses to which it supplies basic amenities like water and sewerage. It is also authorized to build roads within Municipality limits and impose taxes on properties coming under its jurisdiction.

References

See also 
 Wolves of Ashta

Cities and towns in Sehore district
Sehore